The Church of Antioch (Romanization: kánīsa ʾanṭākiya, IPA: [ka.niː.sa ʔan.tˤaː.ki.ja]) was the first of the five major churches of the early pentarchy in Christianity, with its primary seat in the ancient Greek city of Antioch (present-day Antakya, Turkey).

According to Acts 11, at the start of their missionary journeys, Paul the Apostle and Barnabas created a church and preached in Antioch for a year, during which time the followers of the church were called "Christians" for the first time. This was the first mention of the word "Christians" in the Bible.

History

The Church was formed and founded on Pentecost in Jerusalem.  Followers of Jesus as the Messiah (Ha Maschiach), trace the origin of becoming known to the world as 'Christians' to the community founded in Antioch: "Then departed Barnabas to Tarsus, for to seek Saul: and when he found him he brought him to Antioch." For a whole year they met with the church and taught large numbers. The disciples, whose origins began in the dispersion resulting from persecution in Jerusalem, were "first called Christians at Antioch." Known by a variety of names, including "Followers of the Way." Later recognized by the Apostles in Jerusalem, one of its leading members was Barnabas, who was sent to organize the new church (see Acts 11:19-26)  (see Early centers of Christianity). It later became the Patriarchate of Antioch as one of the five major patriarchates – that is the Pentarchy – Pentarchy is a model of Church organization historically championed in the Eastern Orthodox Church. It found its fullest expression in the laws of Emperor Justinian I of the Byzantine Empire.

They were joined by Christians from Cyprus and Cyrene who migrated to Antioch. It was in Antioch that the followers of Jesus were first referred to as Christians.

A main point of interest, however, is connected with the progress of Christianity among the non-Jewish believers. Tradition holds that the first Gentile church was founded in Antioch, where it is recorded that the disciples of Jesus Christ were first called Christians (Acts 11:26). It was from Antioch that St. Paul started on his missionary journeys.

In the dispersion of the original Church at Jerusalem, during the troubles ensuing on the bold action of Stephen, certain Cypriote and Cyrenaic Jews, who had been brought up in Greek communities and who had different perspectives on the world than the Palestinian Jews, came to Antioch. There they made the "innovation" of addressing not merely Jews but also Greeks (see Godfearers for the historical background). We may understand here (1) that the words used imply successful preaching and the admission of Greeks to the Christian congregation, and (2) that such an innovation took place by slow degrees, and began in the synagogue, where Greek proselytes heard the word.

Antioch is intimately connected with the early history of the gospel. It was the great central point from where missionaries to the Gentiles were sent (presumably following the Great Commission). It was the birthplace of the famous Christian father Chrysostom, who died A.D. 407.

Nicolas the deacon of the Seven Deacons was a proselyte of Antioch. The Christians dispersed by Stephen's martyrdom preached at Antioch to idolatrous Greeks, not "Grecians" or Greek-speaking Jews, according to the Alexandrine manuscript , whence a church having been formed under Barnabas and Paul's care. From Antioch their charity was sent by the hands of Barnabas and Saul to the brethren at Jerusalem suffering in the famine.

Paul began his ministry systematically here. At Antioch Judaizers from Jerusalem disturbed the church . Here Paul rebuked Peter for dissimulation (the Incident at Antioch). From Antioch Paul started on his first missionary journey , and returned to it . He began, after the Jerusalem decree, addressed to the Gentile converts at Antioch, and ended, his second missionary journey there . His third journey also began there. Ignatius was subsequently bishop there for forty years, down to his martyrdom A. D. 107.

The seat of the patriarchate was formerly Antioch, in what is now Turkey. However, in the 15th century, it was moved to Syria in response to the Ottoman invasion.

Some Grecian "ancient synagogal" priestly rites and hymns have survived partially to the present, notably in the distinct church services of the Melkite and Greek Orthodox communities of the Hatay Province of Southern Turkey, Syria, Lebanon and Northern Israel. Members of these communities still call themselves Rūm which literally means "Eastern Romans" or Byzantines in Turkish, Persian and Arabic. The term "Rūm" is used in preference to "Yūnāniyyūn" which means Greeks or "Ionians"

Successive branches

Catholic
Maronite Patriarchate of Antioch and all the East –Founded by Maron in the 5th century and survived the later Muslim invasions, reaffirming communion with Rome in the 12th century.
Melkite Catholic Patriarchate of Antioch and of All the East, of Alexandria and of Jerusalem – Formed in 1724 by Cyril VI Tanas, who brought the Antiochian Orthodox community into communion with Rome. Those who rejected this move formed the extant Antiochian Orthodox Church.
Syriac Catholic Patriarchate of Antioch –First formed in 1662 with the election of the Catholic-aligned Andrew Akijan as Syriac Orthodox Patriarch of Antioch, and later re-established in 1782 with the election of the Catholic Michael III Jarweh as the same. Those who rejected these moves formed the extant Syriac Orthodox Church.

The Maronite, Melkite, and Syriac Catholic patriarchates are in full communion with the Catholic Church and thus recognise each other's claims. The Catholic Church also appointed a Latin Patriarch of Antioch in 1000 by way of Bohemond (founder of the Principality of Antioch, one of the crusader states). After the Crusades, this office became titular in 1268, and lasted as titular for many centuries until it was abolished in 1964.

Eastern Orthodox
Greek Orthodox Patriarchate of Antioch and All the East

Oriental Orthodox
Syriac Orthodox Patriarchate of Antioch and All the East

References 

Ancient Antioch
History of Eastern Catholicism
History of Eastern Orthodoxy
History of Antioch
Apostolic sees